The Bandar Bukit Tinggi LRT station is designated to be an elevated light rapid transit station in Bandar Bukit Tinggi, Klang, Selangor, Malaysia, forming part of the Shah Alam line.

The station is marked as Station No. 24 along the RM9 billion line project with the line's maintenance depot located in Johan Setia, Klang. The Bandar Bukit Tinggi LRT station is equipped with the Park & Ride facility, feeder bus and taxi stands, kiosks and restrooms and is directly connected to the AEON Bukit Tinggi Shopping Centre. The station is expected to be operational in February 2024.

Surrounding Developments
Major developments in the vicinity of this Station:
 AEON Bukit Tinggi Shopping Centre
 Bandar Bukit Tinggi 2
 The Canvas Hotel
 Bandar Botanic commercial area
 GM Klang Wholesale City
 The Landmark commercial area
 Impiria Residences
 Car park

References

External links
 Official LRT 3 project website
 LRT 3 project video
 Prasarana Malaysia Berhad, LRT 3 operator
 Bukit Tinggi LRT Station - mrt.com.my
 Batu Nilam (AEON Bukit Tinggi) LRT station facts

Klang (city)
Rail transport in Malaysia